Konstantin Volkov (Russian: Константин Волков; presumed dead 1945) was an NKVD agent and would-be defector.

Approach

In August 1945, Konstantin Volkov, Vice Consul for the Soviet Union in Istanbul, sent a letter to Chantry Hamilton Page, the vice consul in the British embassy, requesting an urgent appointment. Page decided the letter was a "prank" and ignored it. A few days later, on 4 September, Volkov, accompanied by his wife Zoya, arrived in person and asked for a meeting with Page.

Page did not speak Russian, and so he brought in John Leigh Reed, first secretary at the embassy, to translate what Volkov had to say. Reed later reported: "I was serving in our embassy in Turkey in 1945.... One morning this Russian walks into reception looking very nervous and asks to see the acting consul-general, Chantry Page. The Russian is Konstantin Volkov, Page's opposite number in the Soviet embassy. I'd done my Russian exams so I get the job as interpreter. Anyway, it turns out that Volkov is really an NKVD officer and he has decided to defect. He says he wants a laissez-passer for himself and his wife to Cyprus and £27,500. In return he is offering the real names of three Soviet agents working in Britain. He says two of them are working in the Foreign Office, one the head of a counter-espionage organisation in London." 

He asked for £27,500 and a promise of political asylum, stating that if his demands were met he was willing to expose 314 Soviet agents in Turkey and 250 Soviet agents in Britain. More importantly, he said there were two British diplomats (later revealed to be Guy Burgess and Donald Maclean) in the Foreign Office and another man (later revealed to be Kim Philby) in a very high ranking position in the Counter Intelligence Section of the British Secret Intelligence Service (SIS) who were spying for the Soviet Union.

He demanded an answer within three weeks, and insisted that Istanbul not send his information by cable because the Soviets were reading British Cipher System traffic. The news was sent to Sir Stewart Menzies, head of the SIS (commonly known to the media and the public as MI6) by a diplomatic courier. In London, the matter was given to the head of the Russian Section, Kim Philby, who was one of the three Soviet agents that Volkov had threatened to name. Philby recognized this situation, informed his Soviet handlers, and intentionally took a long delay before flying to Istanbul, allowing Soviet agents to reach Volkov first.

Arrest
Meanwhile, Volkov returned to the Soviet Consulate, from where he quickly disappeared. He was last seen as a heavily bandaged figure being hustled aboard a Soviet transport plane bound for Moscow. Also taken on the Soviet aircraft was Zoya Volkov, who had accompanied the Vice-Consul on his visit to the British Consulate and was assumed to have shared his fate.

Aftermath
Philby arrived 21 days late; he defended himself by suggesting that his delay was caused by the slow pace of couriers. The Consulate officials who had met with Volkov were enraged by Philby's delayed arrival, believing his actions criminally incompetent. However, it was soon discovered that the British phone lines between Istanbul and Ankara had been tapped by Soviet intelligence, and that the Volkov matter was discussed during this period. This provided a cover for Philby; it was only six years later that he was eventually dismissed from his intelligence roles due to a series of other suspicious incidents by 1951. 

Philby's identity as a Soviet agent was finally confirmed in 1963, when he defected to the Soviet Union. Years later, while in the USSR, Philby admitted to having informed his NKVD contact about Volkov prior to his own departure for Istanbul. He contemptuously described Volkov as, "a nasty piece of work," and referred to the incident as the greatest obstacle he ever faced.

Notes

See also
 List of Eastern Bloc defectors

References
 Andrew Boyle, The Climate of Treason, pp. 269-70 Hutchinson 1979 
 Kim Philby, My Silent War: The Autobiography of a Spy, Panther 1969 

Soviet spies
Cold War spies
Executed spies
NKVD officers
People executed by the Soviet Union by firearm
Executed Soviet people from Russia
People executed for treason against the Soviet Union
1945 deaths
Year of birth missing
British spies against the Soviet Union